Somers High School may refer to:

Somers High School (Connecticut) in Somers, Connecticut
Somers High School (New York) in Somers, New York